Sunit Kumar Singh is an Indian molecular biologist and professor of Molecular Immunology & Virology at the Banaras Hindu University. Currently he is also the Head of the Molecular Biology Unit at the Institute of Medical Sciences, Banaras Hindu University.

Education and career 
Sunit Kumar Singh earned his PhD in 2005 from University of Wuerzburg in Germany. Singh has been a scientist at Centre for Cellular and Molecular Biology, CSIR from 2006 to 2014. In 2017, he joined the Banaras Hindu University. Prior to these, Singh has worked in research roles at University of California, and School of Medicine, Yale University.

References

External links 
 Sunit K. Singh‬ - Google Scholar

Academic staff of Banaras Hindu University
Living people
Scientists from Uttar Pradesh
Molecular biologists
Indian virologists
Indian biologists
Year of birth missing (living people)